Indian Creek is a village in Vernon Township, Lake County, Illinois, United States. It is part of the Chicago metropolitan area. Per the 2020 census, the population was 536. Police services are provided by Lake County Sheriff and fire/EMS services by the Countryside Fire Protection District.

Geography
Indian Creek is located at  (42.225876, -87.976843).

It has the smallest area of any incorporated place in Lake County.

History

Indian Creek was originally incorporated in 1958 as a response to the threat of annexation by neighboring Vernon Hills.

This location may be confused with the Indian Creek Massacre, detailed below, which actually occurred in LaSalle County near Ottawa, IL. During the Black Hawk War of 1832, which was the last Indian war in Illinois, Indian Creek, was the scene of an attack, by a renegade band of 40-80 Potawatomi and Sauk, on the Davis Settlement, where 15 white settlers were killed and scalped.

Demographics

2020 census

Note: the US Census treats Hispanic/Latino as an ethnic category. This table excludes Latinos from the racial categories and assigns them to a separate category. Hispanics/Latinos can be of any race.

2000 Census
As of the census of 2000, there were 194 people, 65 households, and 59 families residing in the village. The racial makeup of the village was 96.91% White, 0.52% Asian, 2.06% from other races, and 0.52% from two or more races. Hispanic or Latino of any race were 4.12% of the population.

There were 65 households, out of which 33.8% had children under the age of 18 living with them, 72.3% were married couples living together, 12.3% had a female householder with no husband present, and 9.2% were non-families. 7.7% of all households were made up of individuals, and 6.2% had someone living alone who was 65 years of age or older. The average household size was 2.95 and the average family size was 3.10.

In the village, the population was spread out, with 26.3% under the age of 18, 3.6% from 18 to 24, 29.4% from 25 to 44, 28.4% from 45 to 64, and 12.4% who were 65 years of age or older. The median age was 43 years. For every 100 females, there were 106.4 males. For every 100 females age 18 and over, there were 113.4 males.

The median income for a household in the village was $88,206, and the median income for a family was $90,723. Males had a median income of $61,406 versus $32,250 for females. The per capita income for the village was $33,515. None of the families and 0.9% of the population were living below the poverty line.

References

External links
 Encyclopedia of Chicago entry for Indian Creek
 Camp Seaver Fairgrounds
 Discovery Day Camp

Villages in Lake County, Illinois
Villages in Illinois
1958 establishments in Illinois
Populated places established in 1958